A fuzzbox is a device for deliberately introducing distortion in music.

Fuzzbox may also refer to:

 We've Got a Fuzzbox and We're Gonna Use It or Fuzzbox, a 1980s English pop-punk quartet
 FuzzBox, a video-game developer that developed Cyber Org

nl:Fuzz